Walter Surén (15 August 1880, in Thorn – 8 March 1976, in Rottach-Egern) was a general officer with the final rank – General der Luftnachrichtentruppe (en: General of air force communications troops) of the Deutsche Luftwaffe (en: German Air Force) in Nazi Germany. Until the end of WW2 in 1945, this particular general officer rank was on three-star level (OF-8), equivalent to a US Lieutenant general.

Career
Promotions
Fahnenjunker – 09 February 1900
Leutnant – 18 January 1901
Oberleutnant – 01 October 1907
Hauptmann – 10 September 1913
Character as Major – 9 February 1920; full Major – 1 October 1934
Oberstleutnant – 1 January 1935
Oberst – 1 April 1937
Generalmajor (one-star rank) – 1 April 1939
Generalleutnant (two-star rank) – 1 April 1941
General der Luftnachrichtentruppe – 30 January 1945

Walter Surén joined the 1st Railway-Regiment (German Imperial Army, Heer) 09 February 1900, became Fahnenjunker/Fähnrich, was promoted to 2nd lieutenant and served over there until 18 October 1905.
From 19 Oct 1905 to 30 Sep 1907, he served as company officer in the Enterprise-Company of the Railway-Brigade. Due to outstanding performance he was detached to the Military Technical Academy (1907-1911), and became after graduation Adjutant of the Director of Military Railways (1911-1912). The next assignment of Surén was company Officer of the 5th Telegraph-Battalion (1912-1913), and company-chief in the 1st Telegraph-Battalion (1913-1914). After that, he was assigned commander of the Motor-Vehicle-Battalion in the Grand Headquarters (1914-1915). From 1915 to 1916 he commanded the 7th Telephone-Battalion, and became October 13, 1916 “Oberoffizier Nachrichten” (en: staff-officer of the signals troops) in the “Oberkommando des Heeres” (en: Army High Command). The next mission of Surén was commanded the 11th Telephone-Battalion (1 January – 14 March 1917), followed by Group-Telephone-Commander 11./XI. Army-Corps (15 March – 12 August 1917), and Signal-Adviser of the General-Staff of the Army-Group “Deutscher Kronprinz” until the End of WW I. 

From 1 February – 29 April 1919 he served as Group-Signal-Commander with the Special-Purpose-General-Command 52, Border-Protection East, followed by the assignment to leader of the 104th Brigade-Signal-Battalion. With the character as Major Walter Surén was retired 9 February 1920. 

In the capacity as communications engineer, he worked as representative of the “Deutsche Reichsbahn” (en: German Railway-Company) in Yugoslavia (1920 – 1933). 1933 he went back to Germany, employed by the Army, with the Commander Berlin until 28 February 1934. Then he entered the Nazi Luftwaffe, first as supplemental-officer (1 April 1938). His primary mission was handling of the Wire-Signal-Affairs of the newly established “Luftnachrichtentruppe” (en: Air-Signal-Troop), supported to the “Reichsluftfahrtministerium” (RLM) (1934 – 1938). This was followed by the duty as Signals-Leader with Air-Fleet-Command 3 / Commander of the 3rd Air-Signal-Regiment (1 February 1939 – 31 August 1939), next High-Signals-Leader Air-Fleet-Command 3 (1 September 1939 – 18 September 1940), and High-Signals-Leader Air-Fleet-Command 4 (19 September 1940 – 17 November 1942). From November 18, 1942 – 30 September 1943 he was dedicated to Higher-Wehrmacht-Signals-Leader with Commander-in-Chief South. From 1 October 1943 to 31 December 1944, he was acting as Signals-Leader of the Luftwaffe in the RLM. Then he was assigned to the so-called “Führerreserve” (1 January – 28 February 1945). The final mission of Walter Surén was Signal-Leader with Generalfeldmarschall Erhard Milch, General-Plenipotentiary of the Deutsche Reichsbahn (15 March 1945 – … May 1945).

Decorations and awards 
Deutsche Kreuz – in Silber = 21 September 1942, as Generalleutnant and Höherer Fernmeldeführer to the Luftflottenkommando 4
Ritterkreuz des Königlich Preußischen Hausordens von Hohenzollern mit Schwertern
1914 Eisernes Kreuz I. Klasse
1914 Eisernes Kreuz II. Klasse
Ehrenkreuz für Frontkämpfer
Wehrmacht-Dienstauszeichnung IV. bis II. Klasse
Medaille zur Erinnerung an den 01.10.1938 mit Spange „Prager Burg“
Kriegsverdienstkreuz II. Klasse mit Schwertern 
Kriegsverdienstkreuz I. Klasse mit Schwertern

References
 Reinhard Stumpf: Die Wehrmacht-Elite – Rang und Herkunftsstruktur der deutschen Generale und Admirale 1933–1945, Harald Boldt Verlag, Boppard/Rhein 1982. 
 Karl Friedrich Hildebrandt: Die Generale der Luftwaffe 1935–1945 (3 Bde.), Biblio-Verlag, Osnabrück 1991. 

Generals of Air Force Communications Troops
Luftwaffe World War II generals
1880 births
1976 deaths
Recipients of the German Cross
Recipients of the War Merit Cross
Recipients of the Iron Cross (1914), 1st class
Recipients of the Iron Cross (1914), 2nd class

de:Benutzer:Gastlektor/Walter Surén